Acrosticta bicolor is a species of ulidiid or picture-winged fly in the genus Acrosticta of the family Ulidiidae.

References

bicolor
Insects described in 1906